The GMT T1XX is the assembly code for a vehicle platform architecture in development by General Motors for its line of full-size trucks and large SUVs that has been announced to start production in the fall of 2018 for the 2019 model year. The "XX" is a placeholder for the last two digits of the specific assembly code for each model. As an example, the project code for the Suburban is T1YC. The platform replaced the GMT K2XX series that was introduced in April 2013 for the trucks, followed by the December 2013 production of large SUVs.

The vehicles are expected to make some use of aluminum body panels as a weight-saving measure.

Production of the pickups was introduced in January 2018 with a preview of the 2019 model year Chevrolet Silverado, followed by GM's full-size sport-utility vehicles that were introduced in 2019 for the 2021 model year that went on sale in the Spring of 2020. In line with GM's plan to reduce its total number of platforms to four by 2025, the T1XX platform is also expected to include an eventual replacement for the current model of Chevrolet Express which has been in production since 1995 based on the GMT 600 platform.

Vehicles

References 

General Motors platforms